Manina may refer to:

Manina (opera), by Nico Dostal
Manina, character in 1950 film September Affair
Manina, the Girl in the Bikini 1952 French film directed by Willy Rozier and starring Brigitte Bardot, Jean-François Calvé and Howard Vernon
Tamara Manina (born 1934), Soviet Olympic gymnast
Manina, location in Congo-Brazzaville
Manina Vlizianon, village in Greece

See also
"Che gelida manina" ("What frozen little hand"), aria from La bohème